This is a list of television programmes formerly and currently broadcast by the British & Irish children's television channel Nicktoons, a sister network to Nickelodeon.

Current programming

Nickelodeon Programmes
The Patrick Star Show (25 October 2021–present)
SpongeBob SquarePants (22 July 2002–present)

Former programming

Original Programming
Nick Kicks (2016-2017)

Acquired from Nickelodeon (UK)
Renford Rejects (2011)

Acquired from Nickelodeon (US)

Aaahh!!! Real Monsters (2002–2011)
The Adventures of Jimmy Neutron: Boy Genius (2002–2013)
The Adventures of Kid Danger (2018–2019; 2021)
All Grown Up! (2004–2010; 2017)
The Amanda Show (2011)
The Angry Beavers (2002–2010)
As Told by Ginger (2002–2008)
Back at the Barnyard (2008–2014) 
The Barbarian and the Troll (2021)
Blaze and the Monster Machines (2020)
Breadwinners (2014–2020)
Bunsen Is a Beast (2017–2020)
CatDog (2002–2013)
Catscratch (2006–2010)
ChalkZone (2003–2008)
Danny Phantom (2004–2014; 2020)
Doug (2002–2010)
Drake & Josh (2010–2012)
El Tigre: The Adventures of Manny Rivera (2007–2011)
The Fairly OddParents (2002–2022)
Fanboy & Chum Chum (2010–2017)
Harvey Beaks (2015–2018)
Hey Arnold! (2002–2017)
Invader Zim (2002–2017)
It's Pony (2020–2022)
KaBlam! (2002–2005)
Kenan & Kel (2011)
Kung Fu Panda: Legends of Awesomeness (2011–2016; 2019–2021; 2023)
Middlemost Post (2021–2022)
The Mighty B! (2009–2013)
Monsters vs. Aliens (2013–2015)
Monster High (2022–2023)
Mr. Meaty (2007–2008)
My Life as a Teenage Robot (2005–2008)
Ned's Declassified School Survival Guide (2010–2012)
Oh Yeah! Cartoons (2002–2005)
Avatar: The Last Airbender (2006-2017; 2020–2023)
The Casagrandes (2020–2023)
The Legend of Korra (2013–2015; 2020–2023)
The Loud House (2016–2023)
Star Trek: Prodigy (2022-2023)
Transformers: EarthSpark (2022–2023)
The Penguins of Madagascar (2009–2016)
Pig Goat Banana Cricket (2018–2021)
Planet Sheen (2011–2016)
Star Trek: Prodigy (2022–2023)
The Ren & Stimpy Show (2002–2017)
Rise of the Teenage Mutant Ninja Turtles (2018–2020)
Robot and Monster (2013–2016)
Rocket Power (2002–2011)
Rocko's Modern Life (2002–2017)
Rugrats (2002–2022)
Sanjay and Craig (2013–2022)
Supah Ninjas (2012)
Tak and the Power of Juju (2008–2013)
The Tiny Chef Show (2022–2023)
Transformers: EarthSpark (2022–2023)
The Troop (2010–2012)
T.U.F.F. Puppy (2011–2016)
 The Twisted Timeline of Sammy & Raj (2023)
Welcome to the Wayne (2018–2019)
The Wild Thornberrys (2002–2008; 2017)
The X's (2006–2008)

Acquired Programming

 44 Cats (2020–2021)
ALVINNN!!! and the Chipmunks (2016–2022)
Animal Crackers (2002–2004)
Arthur (2002–2004)
Beyblade: Metal Fury (2014–2015)
Beyblade: Metal Fusion (2010–2012)
Beyblade: Metal Masters (2012–2014)
Big Guy and the Rusty the Boy Robot (2004)
Carrot Oont Rabbit
Dan Dare: Pilot of the Future (2004–2006)
 Dorg Van Dango (2020–2022)
Earthworm Jim (2002–2009)
Edgar & Ellen (2007–2009)
George of the Jungle (2007–2010)
Get Blake! (2015–2019)
The Gnoufs (2002–2006)
Gormiti (2009–2015)
Grizzly Tales for Gruesome Kids (2010–2018)
Growing Up Creepie (2007–2010)
Huntik: Secrets & Seekers (2013–2014)
Kappa Mikey (2006–2009)
King (2004–2009)
King Arthur's Disasters (2006–2011)
 Lego City Adventures (2019-2021)
Matt Hatter Chronicles (2011–2015)
Max Steel (2013–2015)
Mix Master (2007–2009)
Mona the Vampire (2002–2003)
Monsuno (2012–2014)
Mr. Bean: The Animated Series (2004–2010)
Mr. Magoo (2020–2023)
My Dad the Rock Star (2005–2006)
Mysticons (2017-2018)
Oggy and the Cockroaches (2014-2018)
Ollie's Pack (2020-2023)
Pelswick (2002–2005)
Pet Alien (2007–2011)
Rabbids Invasion (2014–2019)
Rainbow Butterfly Unicorn Kitty (2019)
Ricky Sprocket: Showbiz Boy (2008–2010)
Rocket Monkeys (2013–2018)
Ryan's Mystery Playdate (2020)
Space Goofs (2005–2008)
Spliced (2009–2013)
The Spectacular Spider-Man (2008)
The Super Hero Squad Show (2009–2012)
The Three Friends & Jerry (2004–2010)
ToonMarty (2017–2018)
Transformers: Animated (2008–2012)
Viva Piñata (2007–2009)
Wayside (2008–2009)
Winx Club (2005–2008)
Yakkity Yak (2003–2006)
Yu-Gi-Oh! (2002–2011)
Yu-Gi-Oh! GX (2006–2011)

See also
 List of programmes broadcast by Nickelodeon (British and Irish TV channel)

References

Nicktoons
Nickelodeon-related lists